Lawrence Dutton (born 9 May 1954) is an American violist, and a member of the Emerson String Quartet. He earned a bachelor's and master's degree from the Juilliard School where he studied with Lillian Fuchs.

He is on the faculty of the State University of New York at Stony Brook, the Robert McDuffie Center for Strings, and at the Manhattan School of Music. Dutton is married to violinist Elizabeth Lim-Dutton.

References 

1954 births
Living people
American classical violists
Juilliard School alumni
Manhattan School of Music faculty
Musicians from New York City
Classical musicians from New York (state)